The men's 10,000 m race of the 2011 World Single Distance Speed Skating Championships was held on March 12 at 12:55 local time.

Results

References

2011 World Single Distance Speed Skating Championships